Egretta is a genus of medium-sized herons, mostly breeding in warmer climates.

Representatives of this genus are found in most of the world, and the little egret, as well as being widespread throughout much of the Old World, has now started to colonise the Americas.

These are typical egrets in shape, long-necked and long-legged. A few plumage features are shared, although several have plumes in breeding plumage; a number of species are either white in all plumages, have a white morph (e.g. reddish egret), or have a white juvenile plumage (little blue heron).

The breeding habitat of Egretta herons is marshy wetlands in warm regions. They nest in colonies, often with other wading birds, usually on platforms of sticks in trees or shrubs.

These herons feed on insects, fish, and amphibians, caught normally by cautious stalking.

Taxonomy

The genus Egretta was introduced in 1817 by the German naturalist Johann Reinhold Forster with the little egret as the type species. The genus name comes from the Provençal French for the little egret, aigrette, a diminutive of aigron, "heron".

As with other heron groupings, the taxonomy of these birds has been a source of dispute. Some of these species have been placed with the great herons in Ardea, and conversely, the large white species such as the great egret are occasionally allocated to Egretta. The fact that some members of the genus have common names of "heron" and some of "egret" , causes further confusion in differentiating between this genus and Ardea.

Species
The genus contains 13 species:

A fossil species, Egretta subfluvia, is known from the Late Miocene or Early Pliocene of Florida.

References

External links

 
Bird genera
Extant Miocene first appearances
Taxa named by Thomas Ignatius Maria Forster